Climacus may refer to:
John Climacus, a 7th-century Greek monk and saint
Climacus (neume), one of the ligature note shapes in Gregorian chant notation